Sethwa is a village situated near the town Jalalpur, at almost 6 km from it. The name Sethwa originates from the amalgamation of Seth and Wa. The word seth in Hindi Language means A Wealthy Person and wa means To Live, so in effect it means a place where wealthy people live and it lives by this name.

It is a multi-faceted village with different types of people. Most of them are involved in agriculture. Some of the boys have gone to nearby cities and some other ones to the metros in the country as well. The houses are well built, it is not a village that lags in anything from at least the towns if not cities. People do have all the essential commodities. They dress well, are in know of the new developments. Every household has at least a motor-cycle if not a car. Almost all adults have their separate mobile phones. Kids are well groomed and know almost everything happening around the world. They revere cricket stars like Sachin & Dhoni. It is a village but it has all the facilities that you can ask for from a small town—except for the electricity which is a problem in entire U.P. not only here.

Among the most prominent personalities of this village is Shri Satya Narayan Dwivedi "Shreesh" (1920–2012). He was a prolific poet in Hindi, Awadhi and Brajbhasha. The U.P Government awarded him Sahitya Bhushan in the year 2000. His son Dr. Prakash Dwivedi is also a well-known Hindi poet. He got the Naamit Puraskaar in year 1992. One of the best educationists of this area, Shri Radhe Mohan Dwivedi was also from this village. He established no less than six schools and colleges. Among them, the best known is BBDIC, Paruiya Ashram & BBDPG College.

References

Villages in Ambedkar Nagar district